Invergordon railway station is a railway station serving the town of Invergordon on the Cromarty Firth, in the Highland council area of Scotland. ScotRail, who manage the station, operate all services.

History 
The station opened on 28 July 1874, as part of the Inverness and Ross-shire Railway, later the Highland Railway and then the London, Midland and Scottish Railway. As of 2011 the buildings are not in use. In 2008/2009, the station underwent a brightening-up programme run by the Invergordon "Off The Wall" group.

Accidents and incidents 
On 26 November 1944, Royal Air Force Short Sunderland DD851 of the No. 4 (Coastal) Operational Training Unit departed Cromarty Firth, RAF Alness on an anti-submarine patrol of the North Sea off the coast of Scotland. During the initial climb a connecting rod on the starboard inner engine broke, the engine caught fire and fell off. The crew are buried in the Stonefall Air Force Cemetery in Harrogate, North Yorkshire.

Facilities 

Both platforms have a help point and benches, whilst only platform 2 has a shelter (passengers on platform 1 have to use the old station buildings for shelter). There is a car park and bike racks adjacent to platform 1. Both platforms have multiple entries, all with step-free access. As there are no facilities to purchase tickets, passengers must buy one in advance, or from the guard on the train.

Location 
The station is located at the south end of Invergordon's High Street and is easily accessible from all areas of Invergordon, the closest area being the densely populated area of South Lodge. Northbound, leaving the station, the track snakes under a one-way road bridge and runs alongside Park Primary School until turning into single track; it then runs through the Invergordon distillery and Inverbreakie housing estate. It then enters the woods.

Platform layout 

Passenger volume 

The statistics cover twelve month periods that start in April.

Services
Prior to this, 3 departures in each direction was the standard service on the line for many years.

In the December 2021 timetable, the station sees 6 services northbound on weekdays (4 to Wick via Thurso, 1 to Ardgay, 1 to Tain) and 4 northbound on Sundays (1 to Wick, 3 to Tain). On weekdays and Saturdays, there are 9 services southbound to Inverness, with 5 on Sundays.

References

Railway stations in Highland (council area)
Railway stations served by ScotRail
Railway stations in Great Britain opened in 1874
Former Highland Railway stations
Invergordon